This is intended to be a complete list of properties and districts listed on the National Register of Historic Places between 59th and 110th Streets in Manhattan.  For properties and districts in other parts of Manhattan and the other islands of New York County, see National Register of Historic Places listings in Manhattan. The locations of National Register properties and districts (at least for all showing latitude and longitude coordinates below) may be seen in an online map by clicking on "Map of all coordinates".



Listings from 59th to 110th Streets

|}

See also

List of New York City Designated Landmarks in Manhattan from 59th to 110th Streets
County: National Register of Historic Places listings in New York County, New York
State: National Register of Historic Places listings in New York

References

59 to 110